Henry Thomas Moore, known as Harry Moore (27 June 1861 – 24 September 1939) was an English international footballer, who played as a full back.

Career
Born in Nottingham, Moore played for Notts County, and earned two caps for England between 1883 and 1885.

References

1861 births
1939 deaths
English footballers
England international footballers
Notts County F.C. players
English Football League players
Association football fullbacks